Shedding for the Wedding is a reality competition series that followed nine overweight couples as they attempted to lose weight and win a dream wedding. The show premiered on Wednesday February 23, 2011 at 9:00 pm Eastern/8:00 pm Central on The CW following the season premiere of America's Next Top Model. The theme song is sung by Tinashe.

Production
On March 11, 2010, The CW announced that it was working on four new reality projects which included Shedding for the Wedding. The project is produced by Raquel Productions with executive producers Dave Broome of The Biggest Loser and Rick Hurvitz and Ari Shofet of Pimp My Ride. On May 20, 2010 at The CW Upfront Presentation in New York, the network announced that Shedding for the Wedding would be part of the network's programming and it will debut in 2011. On August 3, 2010 it was announced that actress and Jenny Craig's spokesperson Sara Rue will be the show's host. The series premiered on February 23, 2011.

Shedding for the Wedding was the lowest rated network television program of the 2010–2011 season, averaging 1.03 million viewers. It was not renewed for a second season.

Cast
 Sara Rue, host
 Brian Worley, wedding planner.
 Nicky Holender, professional fitness trainer and former soccer player in England and the United States.
 Jennifer Cohan, Fitness and Health expert.
 Ashley Koff, registered dietitian.

Contestants

Weight loss graph

 The Couple Competed in the "Til Death Do Us Part" Challenge and Won
 The Couple Competed in the "Til Death Do Us Part" Challenge and was Eliminated
 The Couple was Eliminated, but came back for the Final Weigh In
 The Couple was Eliminated, and did not come back for the Final Weigh In
 Eliminated Couple who Lost the most Weight at Home to Win the Dream Honeymoon
 Engaged Couple Finalist and Runner-Up for the Dream Wedding
 Engaged Couple Finalist and Winner of the Dream Wedding

Ratings
The show began on February 23, 2011, on the CW. With the initial ratings hourly - 0.7/1, adults 18–49, - 0.5/1, adults 18–34, - 0.6/2 and woman 18-43 earning a - 1.0/3 share. It was ranked as the least watched show among all five broadcast networks for the 2010–2011 season, with an average of 1.04 million viewers and a 0.5 rating in adults 18–49.

Syndication
Oxygen Network ran a marathon of the first seven episodes on April 9, 2011. Despite the show's cancellation, CW aired repeats during summer 2011 on Tuesdays at 8:00pm.

References

External links

2010s American reality television series
2011 American television series debuts
2011 American television series endings
The CW original programming
English-language television shows
Fitness reality television series
Television series by Warner Horizon Television
Television shows set in Los Angeles
Wedding television shows